The 125 Squadron "Puma" is a helicopter squadron base at Sembawang Air Base, Republic of Singapore Air Force, the squadron goes by the motto of "Swift in Support", with the Puma as the squadron's motif.

Unit history
Formed in February 1985, the 125 Squadron consisted of twenty-two newly purchased Aérospatiale AS332M Super Puma medium lift helicopters. This was the Republic of Singapore Air Force's third helicopter squadron, after 120 Sqn and 123 Sqn. The pilots for the new helicopters were drawn from the two squadrons and led by Major Chia Sin Kwong, were sent to France to undergo a conversion course.

The first Super Puma made its way to Singapore in July 1985 and the Squadron was officially inaugurated on 4 October 1985. The guest of honour for the ceremony was the then Chief of General Staff, Major-General (later Lieutenant-General) Winston Choo. Three of the Squadron's Super Pumas are permanently painted in red and white paint scheme for conducting Search and rescue (SAR) work, taking over the duty of SAR-configured Bell 212 Twin Huey helicopters from 120 Sqn, which were retired the same year, the motto of the SAR detachment is "That others may live".

Based at Sembawang Air Base, the Super Pumas brought to the RSAF a new dimension in its operational capabilities. Prior to the acquisition of the CH-47 Chinook, SAF relied on the squadron's Super Puma helicopters to transport its light vehicles and troops around on various detachments and training grounds.

During Singapore's National Day, the Super Pumas take on a different, but no less important, role. Since 1986, they have been active participants of the parade, either flying the Singapore flag proudly or simply being part of the flypast. A Super Puma crashed landed on the compound at Sembawang Air Base, with no fatalities.

In 2003 to 2007, then Commanding Officer LTC Yeap Hong Kiat led the squadron in the Banda Aceh Tsunami rescue.

In 2010, then Commanding Officer LTC Ong Jack Sen and the squadron celebrated the 25th anniversary of Super Puma operations in the RSAF.

In November 2016, it was announced that the AS332M Super Puma platform will be replaced by the new Airbus H225M. The RSAF acquired its first order of the new aircraft in 2021, as the COVID-19 pandemic had delayed its initial projected delivery of end-2020.

Aircraft operated
22× AS332M Super Puma (1985–present)
??x H225M (2021–present)

References
Notes

External links
RSAF web page on 125 Sqn & Sembawang Air Base(SBAB)

Squadrons of the Republic of Singapore Air Force
Mandai